Jacopo di Mino del Pellicciaio (14th century) was an Italian painter, active in Siena.

He is also called Giacomo di Mino. He appears to be a follower of Simone Martini. He was the contemporary of Lippo Vanni and Luca Thome, being in 1373 appointed to value one of latter's pictures. His name appears in the Sienese records from 1362 to 1389. In 1367 he aided Bartolo di Maestro Fredi at the Siena cathedral. He is known to have painted book-covers for the Biccherna, and was several times a member of the Grand Council of Siena. He frescoed for the Basilica of San Francesco.

Milanesi mentions a Sienese painter 'Giacomo del Pellicciaio of the order of Friars Minor (Frate Minore).

References

14th-century Italian painters
Italian male painters
Trecento painters
Painters from Siena
Year of death unknown
Year of birth unknown
Catholic painters